Mohan Singh Diwana (1899–1984) was a Punjabi literary scholar and a poet. He is known for the first authentic research in the history of Panjabi literature. His History of Panjabi Literature(1933) was based on his doctoral dissertation. Some of his well-known works include Nīl Dhārā (The Blue Ocean, 1935), Jagat Tamāsha (The World Fair, 1942), Mastī (Ecstasy, 1946–49), and Dhup Chāṅ (Sunshine and Shade, 1932).

References

Punjabi-language poets
1984 deaths
1899 births